The 5th Edda Awards were held on 10 October 2003 at Nordica Hótel in Reykjavik. The awards were hosted by TV presenters Eva María Jónsdóttir and Sverrir Þór Sverrisson (Sveppi). The latter was the previous year's Best Television Personality. 15 awards were given plus the Icelandic Film and Television Academy's Honorary Award.

The film Nói Albinói, directed by Dagur Kári, had the most nominations and wins, being nominated for ten awards and winning six.

Discontinued Awards 
 Best Television Program (staged)

Result 
The nominees and winners were: (Winners highlighted in bold)

Best Film:
 Nói albínói
 Stella í framboði
 Stormviðri
Best Director:
 Dagur Kári  Pétursson, for Nói albínói
 Gunnar B. Guðmundsson, for Karamellumyndin
 Ólafur Sveinsson, for Hlemmur
Best Actor:
 Ólafur Darri Ólafsson, for the Short Film Fullt hús
 Tómas Lemarquis, for Nói albínói
 Þórhallur Sigurðsson (Laddi), for Stella í framboði
Best Actress:
 Edda Björgvinsdóttir, for Stella í framboði
 Elodie Bouchez, for Stormviðri
 Sigurlaug (Didda) Jónsdóttir, for Stormviðri
Best Supporting Actor:
 Hjalti Rögnvaldsson, for Nói albínói
 Þorsteinn Gunnarsson, for Nói albínói
 Þröstur Leó Gunnarsson, for Nói albínói
Best Supporting Actress:
 Anna Friðriksdóttir, for Nói albínói
 Edda Heiðrún Backman, for Áramótaskaupið 2002
 Elín Hansdóttir, for Nói albínói
Best Screenplay:
 Dagur Kári Pétursson, for Nói albínói
 Gunnar B. Guðmundsson, for Karamellumyndin
 Ólafur Sveinsson, for Hlemmur
Best Visual Design:
 Bjarki Rafn Guðmundsson, for special effects in Karamellumyndin
 Jón Steinar Ragnarsson, for set design in í Nói albínói
 Stígur Steinþórsson, for set design in Karamellumyndin
Best Sound or Cinematography:
 Jón Karl Helgason, for cinematography and editing in Mótmælandi Íslands
 Rasmus Videbæk, for cinematography in Nói albínói
 Sigurrós, for music in Hlemmur
Best Documentary:
 
 
 Hlemmur
 
 Mótmælandi Íslands
Best Short Film:
 Burst
 Karamellumyndin
 Tíu Laxnesmyndir
Best Television Program:
 Áramótaskaupið 2002
 
 
 Sjálfstætt fólk
  Popppunktur
 Spaugstofan
Best News Anchor:
 Brynhildur Ólafsdóttir, for Stöð 2 News
 Egill Helgason, for Silfur Egils – Skjárinn
 Ómar Ragnarsson, for RÚV News
Best Music Video:
 Írafár - , directed by Guðjón Jónsson
 Maus -  Life in a Fish Bowl, directed by Björn og Börkur
 Quarashi – Mess it Up, directed by Gaukur Úlfarsson
Best Television Personality:
 Gísli Marteinn Baldursson
Honorary Award:
 Knútur Hallsson, former politician, for his contribution in Icelandic film affairs.

External links 
 Edda Awards official website
 Edda Awards 2003 Photo Gallery at mbl.is

References 

Edda Awards
2003 film awards